The Ministry of Health is a governmental agency of Italy. Its headquarters are in Rome and is led by the Italian Minister of Health.

The Ministry developed the Italian Food Pyramid (Piramide Alimentare Italiana) to guide food and meal planning. The divisions show healthy intake of water, fruits and vegetables, starches (bread, biscotti, pasta, etc.), protein (meat, cold cut meats, eggs, fish, etc.), milk and dairy, and occasional uses (oils, sweets, and alcohol). The pyramid is intended to represent the variety of foods eaten over an entire week, averaged into daily portions.

An example of their legislation is the Italian Device Registration to meet (and exceed) the EEC's Medical Devices Directive.

See also

 Italian Minister of Health

References

External links
 Ministry of Health 

Health
Medical and health organisations based in Italy
Italy
Rome R. XIII Trastevere
2001 establishments in Italy